ClickSoftware is an American technology company which offers automated mobile workforce management and service optimization solutions for enterprise and small businesses, both for mobile and in-house resources. Since 2020, it has been a subsidiary of Salesforce.

ClickSoftware coined the term service chain optimization in 1996.

History 
ClickSoftware was founded in 1997 by Moshe BenBassat and headquartered in Givat Shmuel, Israel. The company's name had earlier been ClickService Software, and IET–Intelligent Electronics before that. BenBassat has held faculty positions at the University of Southern California, at Tel Aviv University and at UCLA. In an interview with The Wall Street Transcript, BenBassat explained that the company developed from what had originally been his own consulting practice.

On Oct 21, 2002, ClickSoftware announced to restate financial statements for 2000 and 2001, as well as the first six months of 2002, following a review of the statements by the company's audit committee.

Shares of ClickSoftware began trading on the NASDAQ in 2000, at the height of the dot-com bubble. In 2003 ClickSoftware was chosen to optimize the scheduling and street-level routing of Deutsche Telekom's T-Com division's field service engineers. At the Summer Olympics in China in 2008 ClickSoftware was responsible for coordinating the activities of hundreds of telecommunications technicians.

In 2013 ClickSoftware successfully integrated its software with the native salesforce1 platform making its products available on the salesforce app exchange.

In 2014, ClickSoftware acquired Xora Inc., a cloud-based mobile workforce management company.

On April 30, 2015, ClickSoftware announced signing a definitive agreement to be acquired by private funds managed by Francisco Partners Management L.P., a technology-focused private equity firm, in an all-cash transaction valued at approximately $438 million. With the completion of the transaction, on July 13, 2015, ClickSoftware became a privately held company, and its ordinary shares ceased to trade on the NASDAQ Global Select Market.  The Company continues to operate under the same brand as ClickSoftware Technologies Ltd. With the conclusion of the deal, Dr. Moshe BenBassat, ClickSoftware's Founder and CEO, retired from the CEO role, though remained a board member of ClickSoftware and also serves as an active advisor in further advancing its strategic goals and growth objectives. Paul Ilse, an Operating Partner with Francisco Partners, has initially been named as Chief Executive Officer of ClickSoftware. On October 1, 2015 Tom Heiser was appointed CEO, replacing Paul Ilse.

Street level routing is used in ClickSoftware and gives service organizations "eyes" on how to best direct field technicians from job to job taking into consideration the exact mapping of the road.

In 2017, ClickSoftware announced the signing of a global reseller agreement with SAP enabling the reselling of the ClickSoftware Field Service Edge solution as the SAP Scheduling and Resource management application by ClickSoftware.

In 2018, former Autotask CEO Mark Cattini joined ClickSoftware as CEO, followed by previous Autotask co-workers Elmer Lai who joined ClickSoftware as CFO and Patrick Burns who joined as Senior Vice President of Product Management.

On August 7, 2019, Salesforce.com announced an agreement to acquire ClickSoftware.

Acquisitions

Acquisition of Xora
On March 5, 2014 it was announced that ClickSoftware would acquire Xora Inc., based in Mountain View, California, which provides software-as-a-service (SaaS) solutions for companies whose success depends on the productivity and efficiency of ‘always mobile’ workers.  The acquisition was for approximately $15 million, including all working capital and net cash adjustments.

Partners
ClickSoftware has a large partnership ecosystem with resellers, system integrators and OEM such as IBM, SAP, Salesforce.com, Accenture, Capgemini, Infosys, EPI-USE, Atos, Infor, Diabsolut and more. StreetSmart products are sold through carrier partners such as Verizon, AT&T and Sprint Corporation.

See also 
 Decision support system
 Service chain optimization
 Field service management
 Enterprise resource planning
 Enterprise mobility management
 Customer relationship management

References 

Software companies based in Massachusetts
Human resource management software
Companies based in Burlington, Massachusetts
Software companies established in 1979
1979 establishments in Israel
Defunct software companies of the United States
Salesforce